The Harmony Borax Works is located in Death Valley at Furnace Creek Springs, then called Greenland. It is now located within Death Valley National Park in Inyo County, California. It is on the National Register of Historic Places.

Origin and twenty-mule teams

After discovery of Borax deposits here by Aaron and Rosie Winters in 1881, business associates William Tell Coleman and Francis Marion Smith subsequently obtained claims to these deposits, opening the way for "large-scale" borax mining in Death Valley. The Harmony operation became famous through the use, from 1883 to 1889, of large twenty-mule teams and double wagons which hauled borax the long overland route to the closest railroad in Mojave, California.

During the summer months, when it was too hot to crystallize borax in Death Valley, a smaller borax mining operation shifted to his Amargosa Borax Plant in Amargosa, near the present community of Tecopa, California. The Harmony Works remained under Coleman's operation until 1888, when his business collapsed.

Frank M. "Borax" Smith

William Coleman's original holdings in the works were subsequently acquired by Frank M. "Borax" Smith in 1890, to become the Pacific Coast Borax Company with the 20 Mule Team Borax brand.  Activity at Harmony Borax Works ceased with the development of the richer Colemanite borax deposits at Borate in the Calico Mountains, where they continued until 1907.

The Harmony Borax Works was placed on the National Register of Historic Places on December 31, 1974. They are part of the National Park Service historical site preservation program in Death Valley National Park.

See also
 Eagle Borax Works

References

Further reading
 "Borax" Smith is a character in the historical fiction novel Carter Beats the Devil by Glen David Gold.

External links

NPS: Death Valley National Park - Harmony Borax Works of Death Valley
NPS: History of the Twenty Mule Teams
NPS: official Death Valley National Park

Mining in California
Ghost towns in Inyo County, California
Geography of Inyo County, California
Industrial buildings and structures on the National Register of Historic Places in California
Open-air museums in California
Pre-statehood history of California
Protected areas of the Mojave Desert
Borax mines
Mines in California
Historic American Engineering Record in California
Historic districts on the National Register of Historic Places in California
National Register of Historic Places in Inyo County, California
National Register of Historic Places in Death Valley National Park
1883 establishments in California